Yeşilbük is a village in the Otlukbeli District, Erzincan Province, Turkey. The village is populated by Kurds of the Lolan tribe and had a population of 29 in 2021.

References 

Villages in Otlukbeli District

Kurdish settlements in Erzincan Province